Hermann, Prince of Hohenlohe-Langenburg (Hermann Ernst Franz Bernhard; 31 August 1832 – 9 March 1913) was the 6th Prince of Hohenlohe-Langenburg and the second son of Ernst I, Prince of Hohenlohe-Langenburg, and Princess Feodora of Leiningen (half-sister of Queen Victoria).

He succeeded to the title of Prince of Hohenlohe-Langenburg (Fürst zu Hohenlohe-Langenburg) on 21 April 1860, when his elder brother signed over his rights to the throne. He died on 9 March 1913 in Langenburg, Kingdom of Württemberg, German Empire (present-day Baden-Württemberg, Germany).

Life and career
From 5 November 1894 to 1 October 1907 he served as Imperial Lieutenant of Alsace-Lorraine, succeeding his kinsman Prince Chlodwig of Hohenlohe-Schillingsfürst.

On 19 September 1899, he and his wife were in a saloon railway carriage at Perth Station. Lieutenant Colonel H A Yorke (RE retired), the Inspecting Officer of Railways who reported on the accident, said that they had had a miraculous escape from injury when another train collided with the stationary train in which they were standing.

Marriage and children
On 24 September 1862 at Karlsruhe, he married Princess Leopoldine of Baden, daughter of Prince William of Baden.

They had three children (one son and two daughters):

Ernst II, Prince of Hohenlohe-Langenburg (13 September 1863 – 11 December 1950) he married Princess Alexandra of Saxe-Coburg and Gotha on 20 April 1896. They have five children. 
Princess Elise of Hohenlohe-Langenburg (4 September 1864 – 18 March 1929) she married Heinrich XXVII, Prince Reuss Younger Line on 11 November 1884. They have five children. 
Princess Feodora Viktoria Alberta of Hohenlohe-Langenburg (23 July 1866 – 1 November 1932) she married Emich, 5th Prince of Leiningen on 12 July 1894. They have five children.

Honours
He received the following orders and decorations:

Ancestry

Literature 
 Kurt Eißele: Fürst Hermann zu Hohenlohe-Langenburg als Statthalter im Reichsland Elsass-Lothringen 1894–1907. O.O., 1950
 Günter Richter: Hermann Fürst zu Hohenlohe-Langenburg. In: Neue Deutsche Biographie (NDB). Vol 9, Duncker & Humblot, Berlin, 1972, p. 491 et suiv.

References

External links 

 Hermann zu Hohenlohe-Langenburg in daten.digitale-sammlungen.de.

1832 births
1913 deaths
People from Langenburg
People from the Kingdom of Württemberg
House of Hohenlohe-Langenburg
Princes of Hohenlohe-Langenburg
19th-century Lutherans
German Lutherans
Free Conservative Party politicians
Members of the 1st Reichstag of the German Empire
Members of the 2nd Reichstag of the German Empire
Members of the 3rd Reichstag of the German Empire
Members of the 4th Reichstag of the German Empire
Generals of Cavalry (Prussia)
Recipients of the Iron Cross (1870), 1st class
Honorary Knights Grand Cross of the Order of the Bath
Honorary Knights Grand Cross of the Royal Victorian Order